K2-138b is a potentially rocky Super-Earth exoplanet orbiting every 2 days around a K1V star. The planet, along with the four others in the system, was found by citizen scientists of the Exoplanet Explorers project on Zooniverse. It was the final planet found in the system and was officially announced on January 8, 2018.

K2-138b is the smallest planet of K2-138 with a radius of 1.57 , meaning it could be rocky. It orbits its host star every 2.35 days at a distance of 0.0338 AU. At this proximity, the planet is likely very hot and receives 486 times the stellar flux as Earth. The planet has likely a rocky core and a substantial atmospheric layer, composed of volatiles.

The K2-138 system is unique for being the first exoplanet system discovered entirely by citizen scientists.

The K2-138 system, including K2-138b will be studied with CHEOPS to further constrain the mass of the planets with transit-timing variation (TTV).

See also
List of exoplanets discovered in 2017

References

Transiting exoplanets
Exoplanets discovered in 2017
Exoplanets discovered by K2
Aquarius (constellation)